Beesby with Saleby is a civil parish in the East Lindsey district of Lincolnshire, England.  It includes Beesby and Saleby. According to the 2001 Census it had a population of 228, increasing to 258 at the 2011 Census.

The main A1104 road from Alford to Louth passes back and forth across the parish. Beesby was once known as Beesby in the Marsh.

Local democracy takes the form of a Parish Meeting.

References

External links

Civil parishes in Lincolnshire
East Lindsey District